is a Japanese language epic fantasy role-playing game released in 1999. Its setting is similar to medieval Europe, including a strong church of monotheism, religious wars and knight-errants.

Player characters, called Engraveds have engraved on their bodies the three stigmatas of 22 Arcaeus (apostles of the light) and can use miracles three times every a session. There are 22 classes (called arcanas) corresponding to Major Arcana of tarot divination. The names of arcanas are same as Arcaeus' ones and named with Latin, for example: Mater (clergy), Adamas (knight), Dextra (alchemist) and Ignis (archer). Players choose three arcanas during character creation. Three arcanas represent character's past, present and future. For instance, he might have lost the throne in the past if his past arcana is Corona (represent royal). In contrast, He may have the destiny that he will ascend to the throne if his future arcana is Corona.

The person who has more than three stigmatas is called Marauder and slain by Engraveds because he has the sin of arrogance and unbelief. But every player character also will become Marauder if his Dignity Point (DP) is lost. At the game's climax, Marauders always shout that "Dedicate Stigmata! We shall hold Lammas tonight." as a traditional statement.

The game system uses only 20 sided dice and special tarot cards.

Peculiar settings
The pope of Ostia Sinistralic that is the most traditional sect is a woman, and a lot of clergy are also women. The messiah called Mater and her nine apostles were also women. Nine apostles are often taken falcons that run after the person as an analogy. Because the messiah's mother was a falconer.
There are many demon lords are hostile to God. The strongest demon lord is Aerglyph lex thunderous. He is blind in one eye and has infinite wisdom. Obviously Aerglyph is modeled on the Norse God Odin.

External links
FarEast Amusement Research

Japanese role-playing games
Fantasy role-playing games
Role-playing games introduced in 1999
Kadokawa Dwango franchises